Giuliano Taviani (born 1969) is an Italian composer.

Life and career 
Born in Rome, Taviani is the son of the director and screenwriter Vittorio. He started studying jazz, singing, and guitar at the Scuola Popolare di Musica di Testaccio, under Giovanna Marini, and after a brief experience as a guitarist and a vocalist in the band Defaillance he enrolled at the Conservatory of L'Aquila where he graduated in composition.

After composing some incidental music, he debuted as a film score composer in 1999, for Gianni Zanasi's A domani. A longtime collaborator of Francesco Munzi, in 2015 he won two David di Donatello for Best Score and Best Song for Munzi's Black Souls.

Filmography

 1998 Piccole anime di Giacomo Ciarrapico
 1999 A domani di Gianni Zanasi
 2000 Fuori di me di Gianni Zanasi
 2001 Tutta la conoscenza del mondo di Eros Puglielli
 2002 Eccomi qua di Giacomo Ciarrapico
 2002 Piovono mucche di Luca Vendruscolo
 2003 Ora o mai più di Lucio Pellegrini
 2003 La volpe a tre zampe di Sandro Dionisio
 2004 Saimir di Francesco Munzi
 2006 Il giorno + bello di Massimo Cappelli
 2007 Stiffs di Frank Ciota
 2007 La masseria delle allodole di Paolo e Vittorio Taviani
 2008 Il resto della notte di Francesco Munzi
 2008 Amore, bugie e calcetto di Luca Lucini
 2008 Forse Dio è malato di Franco Brogi Taviani
 2009 Oggi sposi di Luca Lucini
 2009 Generazione 1000 euro di Massimo Venier
 2009 Due partite di Enzo Monteleone
 2010 Figli delle stelle di Lucio Pellegrini
 2010 La donna della mia vita di Luca Lucini
 2011 Fughe e approdi di Giovanna Taviani
 2011 Nessuno mi può giudicare di Massimiliano Bruno
 2011 Boris - Il film di Giacomo Ciarrapico, Mattia Torre e Luca Vendruscolo
 2011 Il giorno in più di Massimo Venier
 2011 Ex - Amici come prima! di Carlo Vanzina
 2012 Cesare deve morire di Paolo e Vittorio Taviani
 2012 Viva l'Italia di Massimiliano Bruno
 2012 Mai stati uniti di Carlo Vanzina
 2013 Stai lontana da medi Alessio Maria Federici
 2013 Sapore di te di Carlo Vanzina
 2014 Un matrimonio da favola di Carlo Vanzina
 2014 Anime nere di Francesco Munzi.
 2014 Torno indietro e cambio la mia vita di Carlo Vanzina
 2014 Ogni maledetto Natale di G.Ciarrapico, M.Torre, L.Vendruscolo
 2015 Maraviglioso Boccaccio di Paolo e Vittorio Taviani
 2015 Limbo di Lucio Pellegrini
 2016 "Assalto al cielo" di Francesco Munzi
 2016" Non si ruba a casa dei ladri" di Carlo Vanzina
 2017 Rosso Istanbul, regia di Ferzan Özpetek
 2017 "Una questione privata" , regia di Paolo Taviani
 2018 "Caccia al tesoro", regia di Carlo Vanzina
 2019 "Natale a cinque stelle", regia di Marco Risi
 2020 "Figli", di Mattia Torre; regia di Giuseppe Bonito.

''''''MUSIC FOR TV

 2005 Padri e figli di Gianni Zanasi. Fiction di 6 puntate per Mediaset.
 2006 Buttafuori di Giacomo Ciarrapico - Rai3
 2007 Boris di Luca Vendruscolo - Fox
 2008 Boris 2 di Luca Vendruscolo, Giacomo Ciarrapico, Mattia Torre - Fox
 2009 "Boris 3" di Luca Vendruscolo, Giacomo Ciarrapico, Mattia Torre
 2009 Non pensarci di Gianni Zanasi, Lucio Pellegrini
 2010: Un paradiso per due di Pier Belloni
 2016: "Baciato dal Sole" di Antonello Grimaldi
 2017: "La linea Verticale" di Mattia Torre
 2017: "Basta un paio di baffi" di Fabrizio Costa
 2018: "Il sole, l'amore e le altre stelle" di Fabrizio Costa
 2019 :"Made in Italy" di Ago Panini e Luca Lucini
 2019 "Volevo fare la rockstar" di Matteo Oleotto
 2020 “Liberi tutti”, regia di Giacomo Ciarrapico e Luca Vendruscolo
 2020 “Mai scherzare con le stelle ”, regia di Matteo Oleotto

References

External links

1969 births
Living people
Musicians from Rome
Italian male composers
Italian film score composers
David di Donatello winners
Italian male film score composers